Burrows may refer to:

 Plural of burrow
 Burrows (surname), people with the surname Burrows

Places
 Burrows (electoral district), a provincial electoral district in Manitoba, Canada
 Burrows, Saskatchewan, Canada
 Burrows, Indiana, United States
 Burrows Township, Platte County, Nebraska, United States
 USS Burrows, several US Navy ships with this name

See also
 Burroughs (disambiguation)
 Burrow (disambiguation)